Géraldine Laurent (born 18 January 1975) is a French jazz alto saxophonist.

Laurent studied classical piano at the Niort conservatoire before changing to alto saxophone at the age of 12. She has been a member of the Christophe Joneau quartet. In parallel with her main trio with Yoni Zelnik and Laurent Bataille, she also had a trio with Hélène Labarrière et Éric Groleau, concentrating more on free improvisation. She prefers to play jazz standards to original compositions, and cites John Coltrane, Wayne Shorter, Sonny Rollins and Eric Dolphy among her influences.

Discography

As leader
2007: Time Out Trio, with Yoni Zelnik and Laurent Bataille (Dreyfus Jazz, Sony bmg)
2015: At Work

With Aldo Romano
2008: Just Jazz, with Aldo Romano, Henri Texier, Mauro Negri
2010: Complete Communion to Don Cherry, with Romano, Texier, Fabrizio Bosso

With Christophe Joneau
2003: Lavaud Gelade, Christophe Joneau Quartet

With Charles Bellonzi
2006: Abracadadrums, with Charles Bellonzi, Eric Prost, Frédéric d'Oelsnitz, François Gallix (DBA Productions)

References
"Le mystère Géraldine Laurent", Jazzman, n°138, September 2007, p. 24
"Géraldine Laurent, Doutes, paradoxes et certitudes", Jazz Magazine, n°586, p. 46

French jazz saxophonists
Women jazz saxophonists
1975 births
Living people
21st-century saxophonists
21st-century French women musicians